Karon is both a given name and surname. Notable people with the name include:

Karon O. Bowdre (born 1955), American judge
Karon Riley (born 1978), American football player
Jan Karon (born 1937), American writer
Tony Karon, South African journalist

See also

Karol (name)
KaRon Coleman (born 1976), American football player